The National Association of Truck Stop Operators (NATSO) is a Washington-based trade association of over 2,000 locations belonging to the travel plaza and truck stop industries. The organization lobbies the United States federal and local government for laws favorable to their members. It was formerly called the National Association of Truck Stop Operators.

Notably, NATSO supports the ban of commercialization in state-sanctioned service plazas along toll-free roads, the establishment of the Interstate Oasis program (which designates eligible venues as an "oasis" on a sign along the Interstate), the continued federal ownership of the highway system and greater transparency on the pricing procedure of credit card fees.

NATSO has published the bimonthly Stop Watch magazine since 2011.

References

External links
 Official Web Site

Trade associations based in the United States
Truck stops